Igor Ivanovich Akimushkin (May 1, 1929 – 1993) was a Soviet zoologist and writer.

Born in Moscow, he graduated the biological faculty of Moscow State University in 1952.
His first books, Tracks of beast you never met and Following the Legends, were published in 1961.

Igor Akimushkin wrote a large number of popular science books and made a significant contribution to science and made some discoveries by exploring the marine life. Most of his works were translated to other languages. The squid Cycloteuthis akimushkini was named in honour of Igor Akimushkin in 1968 by fellow zoologist Filippova.

His most well known work is the six volume World of Animals.

He worked at the Shirshov Institute of Oceanology, Russian Academy of Sciences.

References

External links 
 FTM Agency, Ltd
 Игорь Иванович Акимушкин

1929 births
1993 deaths
Soviet zoologists
Soviet marine biologists
Soviet writers
Teuthologists
Moscow State University alumni